The Odisha State Beverage Corporation or OSBC is a Public Sector Undertaking (PSU) of Government of Odisha. The OSBC was established on 30 January 2001 with the right and privileges of wholesale trade and distribution of IMFL, Beer and country spirit in the State of Odisha. The Odisha State Beverages Corporation allows the licensed suppliers or manufactures to store their beverages stocks in OSBC warehouses on prepayment of excise duty and import fees.

Odisha State Beverages Corporation has been providing funds for seminars, meetings etc. being arranged for public awareness against illegal liquor trade, identity and
spurious liquor consumption.

References

External links 
Right to Information Odisha Website of Odisha State Beverage Corporation (OSBC)

State agencies of Odisha
Drink companies of India
Alcohol in Odisha
2001 establishments in Orissa
Indian companies established in 2001